Øystein Olsen Ravner (1893-1975) was a Norwegian appointed councilor of state in the NS government of Vidkun Quisling 1940–1941, and minister 1941–1942.

1893 births
1975 deaths
Government ministers of Norway